Hamidullah  or Hameedullah is a male Muslim given name, and in modern usage surname, composed of the elements Hamid and Allah. It may refer to:

Males
Hamidullah Khan (1894-1960), Nawab of Bhopal
Hamid Ullah Afsar (1895-1974), Indian Urdu poet and writer
Hasan Hamidulla, Finnish Tatar writer, publisher, entrepreneur
Muhammad Hamidullah (1908–2002), Hyderabadi Islamic Scholar (born in Hyderabad State)
Mirza Hameedullah Beg (born 1913), Chief Justice of India
Muhammad Hamidullah Khan (born 1938), Bangladesh air force officer
Hamidullah Amin (born 1941), Afghan geographer
Hamidullah (Guantanamo Bay detainee 1119) (born 1963), Afghan
Hamidullah (Bagram detainee) (born 1967), Afghan
Hameedullah Khan Tokhi, Afghan politician
Hamidullah Niyazmand, Afghan provincial governor
Hamidullah Qalandarzai, Afghan provincial governor

Females
Zaib-un-Nissa Hamidullah (1921–2000), Pakistani writer and journalist

Arabic masculine given names